Nicolas Roland Payen (2 February 1914 in Athis-Mons, France – 8 December 2004) was a French aeronautical engineer.
He has been described as the originator of the delta wing.

See also 
 Payen Pa.101, a French experimental aircraft, first flown in 1935 
Payen AP.10, a French experimental aircraft, first flown in 1936
Payen PA-22, a French experimental aircraft, first flown in 1942
 Payen Pa.47, a French two seat, high wing single engine tourer, which first flew in 1949
 Payen Pa 49, a small experimental French turbojet powered tailless aircraft, first flown in 1954
 Payen Arbalète, a small, pusher configuration, experimental French tailless aircraft, first flown in 1965

References

Bibliography
 

1914 births
2004 deaths
French aerospace engineers